Wan-chun's Three Loves (追尋; "Seek") is a 1964 Taiwanese novelette by Chiung Yao. It was translated to English in 1965 by Tommy Lee.

English translation

Plot
The story is set in Beiping (modern Beijing), Republican era China. The protagonist Wan-chun is a tongyangxi (child bride) who was married into the Chou family when she was 8. Her husband was supposed to be Chou Po-chien, 10 years her senior, but before she reached the age to consummate their marriage the brothers Chou Po-chien, Chou Chung-kang, and Chou Shu-hao all fell in love with her. Unable to choose, Wan-chun attempted suicide, and eventually all three brothers left home for good one by one just as wars and revolutions swept across China. Wan-chun would never have a real husband in her life.

Adaptations
Four Loves, a 1965 film
Wan-chun, a 1990 TV series

Novels by Chiung Yao
1964 novels
Taiwanese short stories
Short stories set in Beijing